Tos-Bulak is the name of an area of open fields and a mineral spring situated at , some 9 km south of Kyzyl, Tyva. It is the location of the  Naadym festival (15 August), the Tyvan Republic Day, where various competitions such as horseriding and khuresh (wrestling) are held.

External links
http://throat-singing.blogspot.com/2005/08/naadym.html

Geography of Tuva

Rural localities in Tuva
Kyzyl